The Organisation of National Socialists (Finnish: , KSJ) was a Finnish Nazi party operating in 1940–1944. It was founded and led by Arvi Kalsta, and the party was a continuation of Kalsta's earlier party Finnish People's Organisation. The party board included , Väinö Kari,  and Eino Hanhivaara. Jäger Major Onni Kohonen was also one of the closest associates of Kalsta and active in the party. 

KSJ's Helsinki district began operations in the winter of 1941. The organization in particular received support in Sörnäinen. Local chapters were established in Porvoo, Pori, Hyvinkää and Riihimäki. The party had a weekly newspaper, Kansallissosialisti (National Socialist). In the spring of 1941, KSJ was involved in recruiting Finns to the SS. The party's efforts were led by Väinö Kari. The party was funded by wealthy businessman . KSJ was part of the Finnish Realm Union's effort to unite all pro-German groups.

KSJ had an especially close relationship with the Nazi People's Community Society that Kalsta viewed as their Swedish-language sister organisation. SKJ was abolished on 23 September 1944, pursuant to Article 21 of the ceasefire agreement between Finland and the Soviet Union that forbade fascist parties, on the same day as the agreement was approved and entered into force.

Sources

References

External links
 The party program (in Finnish)

Defunct political parties in Finland
Nationalist parties in Finland
Nazi parties
Political parties established in 1940
Nazism in Finland
Banned far-right parties
Anti-communist organisations in Finland